This is a list of religious people in Hinduism, including gurus, sants, monks, yogis and spiritual masters.

A guru is defined as a "teacher, spiritual guide, [or] godman," by author David Smith. To obtain the title of guru, one must go through a standard initiation process referred to as diksha, in which they receive a mantra, or sacred Sanskrit phrase.

The list

A to C 

 A.C. Bhaktivedanta Swami Prabhupada (1September 189614November 1977)
 Abhinavagupta (c. 9501020)
 Adi Shankara (507 BCE  475 BCE)
 Advaita Acharya (1434–1539)
 Agastyar (3rd millennium BCE)
 Akka Mahadevi (c.1130 - 1160), Kannada literature
 Alvar Saints (700–1000)
 Anandamayi Ma (30April 1896 - 27 August 1982)
 Anasuya Devī, also known as Jillellamudi Amma(28March 192312June 1985)
 Andal (c.767), Tamil literature
 Anukulchandra Chakravarty, also known as Sree Sree Thakur (born 14 September 1888)
 Arunagirinathar (15th Century A.D.)
 Avvaiyar (c. 1st and 2nd century AD), Tamil literature
 Ayya Vaikundar (1809–1851)
 Atri (vedic times) rig veda

 Baba Hari Dass (26March 192325September 2018)
 Baba Mast Nath (born 1764)
 Bahinabai (1628–1700), Marathi literature
 Bamakhepa, or Bamakhyapa/ Bamdev Bhairav (18371911)
 Basava (1105 CE–1167 CE)
 Bhadase Sagan Maraj (1920–1971), Indo-Trinidadian Hindu leader and politician, founded the Sanatan Dharma Maha Sabha
 Dhanna jatt (born 1415)
 Bhagawan Nityananda (November orDecember 18978August 1961)
 Bhakti Charu Swami (17September 1945 – 4 July 2020)
 Bhakti Tirtha Swami (25February 195027June 2005)
 Bhaktisiddhanta Sarasvati (6 February 1874 – 1 January 1937)
 Bhaktivinoda Thakur (2 September 1838 – 23 June 1914)
 Bhaskararaya (c. 1690–1785)
 Bijoy Krishna Goswami (2August 18411899)
 Brahma Chaitanya, also known as Gondavalekar Maharaj (1845–22December 1913)
 Brahmanand Swami (1772–1832)
 Brahmananda Saraswati (20December 186820May 1953)

 Chaitanya Mahaprabhu (18February 148614June 1534)
 Chandrashekarendra Saraswati (20May 18948January 1994)
 Chandrashekhara Bharati III (1892–1954)
 Chattampi Swamikal (c. 1853–1924)
 Chaturbhuj Sahay (3November 188324September 1957)
 Chinmayananda Saraswati (8May 19163August 1993)
 Chokhamela (14th century)

D to F 

 Dada Bhagwan, founder of Akram Vignan (7Novembery 19082January 1988)
 Damodardev (c. 1488c. 1598)
 Dayananda Saraswati (Ärsha Vidya) (15August 193024September 2015)
 Dayananda Saraswati, founder of Arya Samaj (12February 182430October 1883)
 Dhyanyogi Madhusudandas (1878–1994)
 Dnyaneshwar (1275–1296)
 Drona (mythohistorical)
 Eknath (1533–1599)
 Eknath Easwaran (1910–1999)

G to I 

 Gagangiri Maharaj (19064February 2008)
 Gajanan Maharaj (c. mid 19th century)
 Ganapati Muni (c. 1878–c.1936)
 Garib Das (1717-1778)
 Gaurakisora Dasa Babaji (1838–1915)
 Gnanananda Giri (c. early 19th century)
 Gopala Bhatta Goswami (1503–1578)
 Gopalanand Swami (1781–1852)
 Gopi Krishna (yogi) (1903–1984)
 Gora Kumbhar (c. 1267–c.1317)
 Gorakhnath (c. 10th or 11th century)
 Gulabrao Maharaj (6 July 1881 – 20 September 1915 )
 Gunatitanand Swami (17October 178511October 1867)
 Guru Jambheshwar (1451-1536)
 Gurumayi Chidvilasananda (born 24June 1955)

 Hans Ji Maharaj (8November 190018July 1966)
 Haridasa Thakur (born 1451 or 1450)
 Hariharananda Giri, (Paramahamsa Hariharananda) (27May 19073December 2002)

 Isaignaniyar (c. 7th century), Tamil literature

J to L 

 Jaggi Vasudev (born 3September 1957)
 Jalaram Bapa (4 November 1799 23 February 1881)
 Janabai (c. 13th century), Marathi literature
 Jayatirtha (1345–1388)
 Jiva Goswami (c. 1513–1598)

 Kabir (c. 15th century), Indian saint and mystic
 Kalki Bhagwan (born 1949) 
 Kamlesh D. Patel, also known as Daaji (born 28 September 1965)
 Kanakadasa (1509–1609)
 Kanhopatra (c. 15th century), Marathi literature
 Kanwar Saheb
 Karaikkal Ammaiyar (c. 6th century), Tamil literature
 Khatkhate Baba (1859–1930)
 Kirpal Singh (c. 1894–1974), (Sawan Kirpal Ruhani Mission)
 Kirupanandha Variyar (25August 19067November 1993)
 Kripalu Maharaj (5October 192215November 2013)
 Krishna Prem (1898–1965)
 Krishnadasa Kaviraja (born 1496)
 Krishnananda Saraswati (25April 192223November 2001)

 Lahiri Mahasaya, (Shyamacharan Lahiri) (30September 182826September 1895)
 Lakshman Joo (9May 190727September 1991), modern scholar of Kashmiri Shaivism
 Lakshmanananda Saraswati (192623August 2008)
 Lalleshwari (c.13201392), Kashmiri literature

M to O 

 Madhavdev (c. 1489c. 1596)
 Madhvacharya (c. 12381317)
 Mahant Swami Maharaj (born 13September 1933)
 Maharishi Mahesh Yogi (12January 19185February 2008)
 Mahavatar Babaji (mid 19thmid 20th century)
 Mangayarkkarasiyar (c. 7th century), Tamil literature
 Manik Prabhu
 Master C. V. V. (4 August 1868 – 12 May 1922)
 Mata Amritanandamayi (born 27September 1953)
 Matsyendranath (c. 10th century)
 Meera (c. 1498c. 1547), Hindi literature
 Mehi (28April 18858June 1986)
 Mirra Alfassa (21February 187817November 1973)
 Morari Bapu (born 25September 1946)
 Mother Meera (born 26December 1960)
 Muktabai (c.12791297), Marathi literature
 Muktanand Swami (1758–1830)
 Muktananda (16May 19082October 
 Muthuswami Dikshitar (24March 177621October 1835)

 Namdev (c. 1270c. 1350)
 Narasimha Saraswati(1378–1459)
 Narayan Maharaj (20May 18853September 1945)
 Narayana Guru, writer of Daiva Dasakam (c. 18541928)
 Narayanprasaddasji Swami (14January 192130January 2018), also known as Tapomurti Shastri Swami (Gujarati: તપોમૂર્તિ શાસ્ત્રી સ્વામી) and Guruji by his devotees, was one of the most noted Swami of the Swaminarayan Sampraday
 Narottama Dasa (born 1466)
 Narsinh Mehta (1414–1481), also known as Narsi Mehta or Narsi Bhagat
 Nayakanahatti Thipperudra Swamy (c. 15th–c. 16th century), also known as Nayakanahatti Thippeswamy
 Nayanmars Saints (700–1000)
 Neem Karoli Baba (c. late 19th or early 20th century 11September 1973)
 Nigamananda Paramahansa (18August 1880 – 29November 1935)
 Nimbarka (c. 13th century or earlier)
 Niranjanananda (c. 18629May 1904)
 Nirmala Srivastava, also known as Shri Mataji Nirmala Devi (21March 192323February 2011)
 Nisargadatta Maharaj(17April 18978September 1981)
 Nishkulanand Swami (1766–1848)
 Nityananda Prabhu (born 1474)

 Om Swami (born 1979)
 Osho (11 December 1931 – 19 January 1990)

P to R 

 Panth Maharaj (3 September 1855 – 16 October 1905)
 Paramahansa Yogananda (5January 18937March 1952)
 Parthasarathi Rajagopalachari, also known as chariji (24 July 1927 – 20 December 2014)
 Pattinathar (c. 10th or 14th century AD)
 Pavhari Baba (birth unknown1898)
 Potuluri Virabrahmendra Swami (c. 17th century)
 Prabhat Ranjan Sarkar, also known as Shrii Shrii Anandamurti (21May 192121October 1990)
 Pramukh Swami Maharaj (born 7December 1921–13 August 2016)
 Pranavananda, also known as Yugacharya Srimat Swami Pranavananda Ji Maharaj (29January 18968February 1941)
 Pranavanda Saraswati (28August 190828August 1982)
 Prem Rawat, also known as Maharaji, Guru Maharaj Ji, and Balyogeshwar (born 10December 1957)
 Purandara Dasa (c. 1484 – c. 1565)
 Puran Puri (born 1742)

 Rambhadracharya (born 14January 1950)
 Ramdas Kathiababa  (early 24 July 1800 – 8 February 1909)
 Ramdev Pir   (1352–1385 AD)
 Radhanath Swami (born 7December 1950)
 Raghavendra Swami (15951671)
 Raghunatha Bhatta Goswami (1505–1579)
 Rajinder Singh (spiritual master) (20 September 1946) (Sawan Kirpal Ruhani Mission) (Founder of Science of Spirituality)
 Rakeshprasad (born 23July 1966)
 Raghuttama Tirtha (15371596)
 Ram Chandra (Babuji) (30 April 1899 – 19 April 1983)
 Ram Thakur  (2February 18601May 1949)
 Rama Tirtha (22October 187327October 1906)
 Ramakrishna (18February 183616August 1886) See Disciples
 Ramalinga Swamigal (5 October 1823 Disappeared on 30 January 1874), also known as Vallalar
 Ramana Maharshi (30December 187914April 1950)
 Ramanuja (c. 1017c. 1137)
 Ramprasad Sen (c. 1718 or c. 1723c. 1775)
 Ravidas (1398–1540)
 Rupa Goswami (1489–1564)

S to U 

 Sant Rampal Ji Maharaj (1951–present)
 Sahadeo Tiwari (1892–1972),
 Sai Baba of Shirdi (1838–1918)
 Samarth Ramdas (1608–1681)
 Sanatana Goswami (1488–1558)
 Sankardev (c. 1449c. 1568)
 Sant Charandas (1703–1782)
 Sant Nirmala (c. 14th century), Marathi literature
 Sant Soyarabai (c. 14th century), Marathi literature
 Sarada Devi (22 December 1853 – 20 July 1920)
 Satchidananda Saraswati (22December 191419August 2002)
 Sathya Sai Baba (23November 192624April 2011)
 Satnarayan Maharaj (born 1931), Indo-Trinidadian Hindu leader and son-in-law of Bhadase Sagan Maraj
 Satsvarupa dasa Goswami (born 6December 1939)
 Satya Narayan Goenka (30January 192429September 2013)
 Satyananda Giri (17November 18962August 1971)
 Satyananda Saraswati (25December 19235December 2009)
 Satyapramoda Tirtha (1918–1997)
 Shaunaka,
 Seshadri Swamigal (22January 18704January 1929)
 Shivabalayogi (24January 193528March 1994)
 Shreedhar Swami (7December 190819April 1973)
 Shrimad Rajchandra (11November 18679April 1901)
 Shripad Shri Vallabha
 Shrivatsa Goswami (27October 1950present
 Shyama Shastri (26April 17626February 1982)
 Sitaramdas Omkarnath (17February 18926December 1827)
 Sivananda Saraswati (8September 188714July 1963)
 Sivaya Subramuniyaswami (5January 192712November 2001)
 Soham Swami (birth unknown1918)
 Sopan (c. 13th century)
 Sri Aurobindo (15August 18725December 1950)
 Sripadaraja (c. 1422 – 1480)
 Sri Chinmoy (27August 193111October 2007)
 Sri M (born 06November 1948)
 Sri Sri Ravi Shankar (born 1956)
 Sudhanshu Ji Maharaj (born May 1955)
 Surdas (c. late 15th-century)
 Swami Abhedananda (2October 18668September 1939)
 Swami Bhoomananda Tirtha (born 13May 1933)
 Swami Chidbhavananda (11March 189816November 1985)
 Swami Janakananda (born 13June 1939)
 Swami Keshwanand Satyarthi (born 5 September 1943), (Paramhans Satyarthi Mission, Advait Mat )
 Swami Nithyananda (born 1January 1978 or 13March 1977)
 Swami Purnachaitanya (born 1984)
 Swami Sri Yukteswar Giri (1855–1936)
 Swami Rama (1925–1996)
 Swami Ramanand (c. 1738c. 1802)
 Swami Ramdas (10April 188425July 1963)
 Swami Samarth
 Swami Vivekananda (12January 18634July 1902)
 Swaminarayan (3April 17811June 1830)
 Swarupanand (1February 18849April 1936), part of Advait Mat lineage
 Swarupananda (8July 187127June 1906)

 Tibbetibaba (birth unknown19November 1930)
 Trailanga (1607–1887)
 Tukaram (c. 16081649)
 Tulsidas (1532–1623), also known as Goswami Tulsidas
 Tyagaraja (4May 17676January 1847)

 Upasni Maharaj (15May 187024December 1941)
 Uppaluri Gopala Krishnamurti (9July 1918 22March 2007)
 Utpaladeva (ca. 900–950), teacher of Kashmiri Shaivism

V to X 

 Vallabha Acharya (14791531)
 Vadiraja Tirtha (1480–1600)
 Vasugupta (~ 800–850 CE), author of the Shiva Sutras in Kashmiri Shaivism
 Vidyaranya (c. 1268c. 1386)
 Vishuddhananda Paramahansa (14March 185314July 1937)
 Vishwesha Tirtha (1931–2019)
 Vyasatirtha (c. 1460 – 1539)
 Vasistha (Rig Veda)

Y to Z 

 Yogaswami (1872March 1964)
 Yogi Ramsuratkumar (1December 191820February 2001)
 Yogiji Maharaj (23 May 1892 – 23 January 1971)
 Yukteswar Giri (10May 18559March 1936)

See also 

 Dalit saints of Hinduism
 List of Hindus
 List of founders of religious traditions
 Modern yoga gurus

References 

Gurus and saints
Sant Mat
Hinduism-related lists